Tixati is a proprietary Linux and Windows BitTorrent client written in C++. It has standalone and portable versions with each new client version.

Features 
In addition to standard BitTorrent client-sharing functions, Tixati provides integral chatrooms with channel chat as well as private messaging being encrypted. Chatrooms can be either public or secret. Users are allowed to optionally share lists of magnet or URL links which are then searchable across all channels a user is joined to. Browsing a specific user's share list is also supported. The channels also allow for streaming audio and video media.

Fopnu 

Since July 20, 2017, the developers of Tixati have released regular updates of a new P2P system (network and client) called Fopnu. It's visually similar to Tixati but Fopnu is not a torrent client. Fopnu is a decentralized network with the latest advances in P2P technology, pure UDP and with all communications being encrypted. The ad-free freeware client includes chat rooms, contacts list (with private messages), search windows, browsing of a contact's library and creation of contacts groups (to control access to your library). Sharing massive amounts of files is much easier (than creating a lot of Torrent files) and has very little overhead.

Reception 
In 2012, TorrentFreak listed it among the top 10 μTorrent alternatives. The same year, it received a positive review from Ghacks. A 2014 review at BestVPN.com praised it for its lightweight design. In May 2015, Tixati was the fifth most popular torrent client by the audience of Lifehacker.

On January 6, 2017 the developer announced the release of version 2.52 for user alpha testing, which added an encrypted forum function to the channels. Posts to the forum may be visible to all users in the channel or may be private, between only 2 users. In March 2017, it was listed as a popular Bittorrent client by Tom's Guide. In December 2017, it received a positive review by TechRadar. In January 2018, it was reviewed positively by Lifewire.

See also 
 Comparison of BitTorrent clients
 Usage share of BitTorrent clients
 WinMX

References

External links 
 

Windows file sharing software
BitTorrent clients for Linux
Cross-platform software
BitTorrent clients